The 67th Writers Guild of America Awards honor the best film, television, radio and video-game writers of 2014. The nominations for television, new media, and radio categories were announced on December 4, 2014. The nominations for original, adapted, and documentary screenplay nominations were announced on January 7, 2015. The winners were announced in simultaneous ceremonies in Los Angeles and New York on February 14, 2015.

Nominees

Film

Television

Radio

Promotional Writing

Videogames

References

External links
Official Site

2014
2014 film awards
2014 television awards
2014 guild awards
2014 awards in the United States
2014 in American cinema
2014 in American television
February 2015 events in the United States